Torta Barozzi is a traditional Italian dessert.

Italian pastry chef Eugenio Gollini created the cake in his pastry shop in 1897 in Vignola and named it in honor of Italian renaissance architect Giacomo Barozzi da Vignola. The ingredients for this cake have been a well-kept secret all these years. This is a chocolate cake, mainly flavored with rum, coffee, and almonds. It is flourless and gluten free. The cake can be cut and served in thin wedges. This cake delivers every taste sensation of a moist, fudgy texture, punctuated with the crunchiness of the ground almonds, a meringue-like top, and the sweet and smooth taste of aceto balsamico tradizionale (traditional balsamic vinegar).

See also 
List of Italian dishes

References

Sources 
 
Italian cakes